Molette is a white French wine grape planted primarily in the Savoie region. As a varietal wine, Molette tends to produce neutral tasting wine so it is often blended with Roussette to add more complexity.

DNA analysis has revealed Molette to be a cross between Gouais blanc and an unidentified grape variety.

Synonyms
Molette is also known under the synonyms Molette blanche and Molette de Seyssel.

Molette is also used as a synonym for Mondeuse blanche and Mondeuse noire. Furthermore, Molette noire is a synonym of Mondeuse noire and Molette de Montmelian is a synonym of Jacquère.

References

White wine grape varieties
French wine